Jonathan Marray and Frederik Nielsen were the defending champions, but decided not to play together. Marray played alongside Colin Fleming but lost to Robert Lindstedt and Daniel Nestor in the third round. Nielsen paired with Grigor Dimitrov but they lost to Julien Benneteau and Nenad Zimonjić in the second round.

Bob and Mike Bryan defeated Ivan Dodig and Marcelo Melo in the final, 3–6, 6–3, 6–4, 6–4 to win the gentlemen's doubles title at the 2013 Wimbledon Championships. With the victory, the Bryan brothers completed the "Bryan Slam", or a non-calendar year Golden Slam,  and thus became the first doubles team in tennis history to hold all four majors as well as Olympic gold at the same time. The Bryans are also the first men's doubles team in the Open era to hold all four Grand Slam titles at once.

Seeds

  Bob Bryan /  Mike Bryan (champions)
  Marcel Granollers /  Marc López (first round)
  Alexander Peya /  Bruno Soares (third round)
  Leander Paes /  Radek Štěpánek (semifinals)
  Aisam-ul-Haq Qureshi /  Jean-Julien Rojer (third round)
  Robert Lindstedt /  Daniel Nestor (quarterfinals)
  Max Mirnyi /  Horia Tecău (third round)
  Mahesh Bhupathi /  Julian Knowle (quarterfinals)
  Colin Fleming /  Jonathan Marray (third round)
  Santiago González /  Scott Lipsky (second round)
  Julien Benneteau /  Nenad Zimonjić (quarterfinals)
  Ivan Dodig /  Marcelo Melo (final)
  Michaël Llodra /  Nicolas Mahut (second round)
  Rohan Bopanna /  Édouard Roger-Vasselin (semifinals)
  Łukasz Kubot /  Marcin Matkowski (third round)
  Treat Huey /  Dominic Inglot (third round)

Qualifying

Draw

Finals

Top half

Section 1

Section 2

Bottom half

Section 3

Section 4

References

External links

2013 Wimbledon Championships – Men's draws and results at the International Tennis Federation

Men's Doubles
Wimbledon Championship by year – Men's doubles